Rabbi David Twersky (born October 28, 1940), originally spelled Twerski, is the Grand Rabbi and spiritual leader of the village of New Square, New York, and of Skverer Hasidism worldwide.

Early life
Twersky was born in Iaşi, Romania, in 1940. In 1945, at the end of World War II, his family moved to Bucharest. In 1947, they emigrated to the United States, where they settled in Borough Park, Brooklyn, and later in Williamsburg, Brooklyn. Twersky's father, Rabbi Yakov Yosef Twersky, established the all-Hasidic village of New Square in Rockland County in 1954.

Family
At the age of 18, Twersky married Chana Chaya Hager, the elder daughter of the Vizhnitzer Rebbe of Bnei Brak, Israel, Rabbi Moshe Yehoshua Hager. The couple has four sons and three daughters:

Rabbi Aaron Menachem Mendel Twersky is the eldest son of the Skverer Rebbe. He is often sent as an emissary of his father. He married Chavah Reizel, daughter of his uncle, Grand Rabbi Mordechai Hager of Viznitz-Monsey.
Rabbi Yitzchok, married Malka Henya, daughter of his uncle, Grand Rabbi Yisroel Hager of Vizhnitz Bnei Brak.
Rebbetzin Hinda, the wife of Rabbi Avrohom Yehoshua Heschl, son of her uncle, Grand Rabbi Chai Yitzchok Twersky of Rachmistrivka Borough Park.
Rabbetzin Tzipporah, the wife of Rabbi Eliezer Goldman, son of the previous Grand Rabbi of Zvhil.
Rebbetzin Sima Mirl, the wife of Rabbi Yakov Yosef, a grandson of Grand Rabbi Mordechai Hager of Vizhnitz-Monsey.
Rabbi Yakov Yosef, previously married to Chana Yenta, a daughter of Grand Rabbi Yeshaya Twersky, the Rebbe of Chernobyl in Borough Park. The couple divorced in Kislev of 5781 (approx. November or December 2020).
Rabbi Chaim Meir, married Rochel Dina, daughter of the Grand Rabbi of Barnov, who is the son of the Grand Rabbi Moshe Halberstam of Kiviashd and the son-in-law of Grand Rabbi Chai Yitzchok Twersky of Rachmastrivka (Hasidic dynasty) Rachmastrivka-Boro Park.

Lineage
Twersky is considered to be the nearest living descendant of the Ba'al Shem Tov, and of the Ba'al Shem Tov's disciple Rabbi Menachem Nachum of Chernobyl.

Lineage from Ba'al Shem Tov
 Ba'al Shem Tov
 Rabbi Tzvi
 Rabbi Aaron of Tituv
 Rabbi Tzvi of Tituv (Hershele Skverer)
 Chana Sima (married Rabbi Yitzchak Twerski of Skvira)
 Rabbi David Twersky of Skvira
 Rabbi Yakov Yosef Twersky, previous Rebbe of Skver
 Rabbi David Twersky

Lineage from Rabbi Menachem Nachum Twerski of Chernobyl
 Rabbi Menachem Nachum Twerski of Chernobyl
 Rabbi Mordechai Twersky of Chernobyl
 Rabbi Yitzchak Twersky of Skvira
 Rabbi David Twersky of Skvira
 Rabbi Yakov Yosef Twersky, previous Rebbe of Skver
 Rabbi David Twersky

As Grand Rabbi
In April 1968, following his father's death, Twersky assumed the leadership of New Square, and of Skverer Hasidim worldwide. According to The Jewish Daily Forward, most New Square residents "revere their rebbe as a Saint, and look to him for guidance on all issues", showing their devotion, singing and praying at his weekly "tish". The Forward also reports that Twersky lights his Hanukkah candles on a large sterling silver menorah that a wealthy follower bought him. He exerts authority through a body of about 15 persons appointed by him, known as "the Kehilla".

Political influence
As in many Hasidic communities, the community in New Square tends to exercise its voting power as a bloc, under the guidance of the Grand Rabbi. He usually supports incumbents or those likely to win, putting the community in a good position to receive government support.

In 1992, New Square voted 822 for President George Bush, to 93 for Bill Clinton. In 1996, voters supported President Clinton over Bob Dole, 1,110 to 31. In 1994, voters backed Mario Cuomo against George Pataki, 907 to 63, and in 1998, voters backed Governor Pataki over Democrat Peter Vallone, 1,132 to 8. In November 2000, vice president Al Gore received more votes than George W. Bush, 1,388 to 25, after Mr. Gore visited Twersky in February of the year. During the 2000 Senate campaign, First Lady Hillary Clinton visited Rabbi Twersky and his wife in New Square, while running for the U.S. Senate, and received nearly 100 percent of the local vote. Twersky was invited to the White House in December 2000 (Hanukkah 5761), and secured commutations for the criminal sentences of four Skver Hasidim, who had been convicted of defrauding the government of more than 30 million dollars to benefit the educational institutions of New Square.

See also
 Chernobyl (Hasidic dynasty)

References

External links
 
 
 Complaint Rottenberg vs. Twersky and Spitzer. Supreme Court of the State of New York

Skver (Hasidic dynasty)
People from New Square, New York
People from Iași
People from Williamsburg, Brooklyn
Romanian Orthodox rabbis
American Hasidic rabbis
Romanian emigrants to the United States
Living people
1940 births
Hasidic rebbes
Descendants of the Baal Shem Tov
People from Borough Park, Brooklyn
Rabbis from New York (state)
Rebbes of Skver